Vladimír Malý (born 27 June 1952) is a Czech former High jumper.

Biography
He won gold medal in the high jump at the 1975 European Athletics Indoor Championships.

Achievements

References

External links
 Athlete profile from site Track and Field Statistics

1952 births
Living people
Czech male high jumpers
European Athletics Championships medalists
Universiade medalists in athletics (track and field)
Universiade gold medalists for Czechoslovakia
Medalists at the 1973 Summer Universiade